

R03A Adrenergics, inhalants

R03AA Alpha- and beta-adrenoreceptor agonists
R03AA01 Epinephrine

R03AB Non-selective beta-adrenoreceptor agonists
R03AB02 Isoprenaline
R03AB03 Orciprenaline

R03AC Selective beta-2-adrenoreceptor agonists
R03AC02 Salbutamol
R03AC03 Terbutaline
R03AC04 Fenoterol
R03AC05 Rimiterol
R03AC06 Hexoprenaline
R03AC07 Isoetarine
R03AC08 Pirbuterol
R03AC09 Tretoquinol
R03AC10 Carbuterol
R03AC11 Tulobuterol
R03AC12 Salmeterol
R03AC13 Formoterol
R03AC14 Clenbuterol
R03AC15 Reproterol
R03AC16 Procaterol
R03AC17 Bitolterol
R03AC18 Indacaterol
R03AC19 Olodaterol

R03AH Combinations of adrenergics

R03AK Adrenergics in combination with corticosteroids or other drugs, excl. anticholinergics
R03AK01 Epinephrine and other drugs for obstructive airway diseases
R03AK02 Isoprenaline and other drugs for obstructive airway diseases
R03AK04 Salbutamol and sodium cromoglicate
R03AK05 Reproterol and sodium cromoglicate
R03AK06 Salmeterol and fluticasone
R03AK07 Formoterol and budesonide
R03AK08 Formoterol and beclometasone
R03AK09 Formoterol and mometasone
R03AK10 Vilanterol and fluticasone furoate
R03AK11 Formoterol and fluticasone
R03AK12 Salmeterol and budesonide
R03AK13 Salbutamol and beclometasone
R03AK14 Indacaterol and mometasone

R03AL Adrenergics in combinations with anticholinergics incl. triple combinations with corticosteroids
R03AL01 Fenoterol and ipratropium bromide
R03AL02 Salbutamol and ipratropium bromide
R03AL03 Vilanterol and umeclidinium bromide
R03AL04 Indacaterol and glycopyrronium bromide
R03AL05 Formoterol and aclidinium bromide
R03AL06 Olodaterol and tiotropium bromide
R03AL07 Formoterol and glycopyrronium bromide
R03AL08 Vilanterol, umeclidinium bromide, and fluticasone furoate
R03AL09 Formoterol, glycopyrronium bromide and beclometasone
R03AL10 Formoterol and tiotropium bromide
R03AL11 Formoterol, glycopyrronium bromide, and budesonide
R03AL12 Indacaterol, glycopyrronium bromide and mometasone

R03B Other drugs for obstructive airway diseases, inhalants

R03BA Glucocorticoids
R03BA01 Beclometasone
R03BA02 Budesonide
R03BA03 Flunisolide
R03BA04 Betamethasone
R03BA05 Fluticasone
R03BA06 Triamcinolone
R03BA07 Mometasone
R03BA08 Ciclesonide
R03BA09 Fluticasone furoate

R03BB Anticholinergics
R03BB01 Ipratropium bromide
R03BB02 Oxitropium bromide
R03BB03 Stramoni preparations
R03BB04 Tiotropium bromide
R03BB05 Aclidinium bromide
R03BB06 Glycopyrronium bromide
R03BB07 Umeclidinium bromide
R03BB08 Revefenacin
R03BB54 Tiotropium bromide, combinations

R03BC Antiallergic agents, excluding corticosteroids
R03BC01 Cromoglicic acid
R03BC03 Nedocromil

R03BX Other drugs for obstructive airway diseases, inhalants
R03BX01 Fenspiride

R03C Adrenergics for systemic use

R03CA Alpha- and beta-adrenoreceptor agonists
R03CA02 Ephedrine

R03CB Non-selective beta-adrenoreceptor agonists
R03CB01 Isoprenaline
R03CB02 Methoxyphenamine
R03CB03 Orciprenaline
R03CB51 Isoprenaline, combinations
R03CB53 Orciprenaline, combinations

R03CC Selective beta-2-adrenoreceptor agonists
R03CC02 Salbutamol
R03CC03 Terbutaline
R03CC04 Fenoterol
R03CC05 Hexoprenaline
R03CC06 Isoetarine
R03CC07 Pirbuterol
R03CC08 Procaterol
R03CC09 Tretoquinol
R03CC10 Carbuterol
R03CC11 Tulobuterol
R03CC12 Bambuterol
R03CC13 Clenbuterol
R03CC14 Reproterol
R03CC15 Formoterol
R03CC53 Terbutaline, combinations
R03CC63 Clenbuterol and ambroxol
QR03CC90 Clenbuterol, combinations

R03CK Adrenergics and other drugs for obstructive airway diseases

R03D Other systemic drugs for obstructive airway diseases

R03DA Xanthines
R03DA01 Diprophylline
R03DA02 Choline theophyllinate
R03DA03 Proxyphylline
R03DA04 Theophylline
R03DA05 Aminophylline
R03DA06 Etamiphylline
R03DA07 Theobromine
R03DA08 Bamifylline
R03DA09 Acefylline piperazine
R03DA10 Bufylline
R03DA11 Doxofylline
R03DA12 Mepyramine theophyllinacetate
R03DA20 Combinations of xanthines
R03DA51 Diprophylline, combinations
R03DA54 Theophylline, combinations excluding psycholeptics
R03DA55 Aminophylline, combinations
R03DA57 Theobromine, combinations
R03DA74 Theophylline, combinations with psycholeptics

R03DB Xanthines and adrenergics
R03DB01 Diprophylline and adrenergics
R03DB02 Choline theophyllinate and adrenergics
R03DB03 Proxyphylline and adrenergics
R03DB04 Theophylline and adrenergics
R03DB05 Aminophylline and adrenergics
R03DB06 Etamiphylline and adrenergics

R03DC Leukotriene receptor antagonists
R03DC01 Zafirlukast
R03DC02 Pranlukast
R03DC03 Montelukast
R03DC04 Ibudilast
R03DC53 Montelukast, combinations

R03DX Other systemic drugs for obstructive airway diseases
R03DX01 Amlexanox
R03DX02 Eprozinol
R03DX03 Fenspiride
R03DX05 Omalizumab
R03DX06 Seratrodast
R03DX07 Roflumilast
R03DX08 Reslizumab
R03DX09 Mepolizumab
R03DX10 Benralizumab
R03DX11 Tezepelumab

References

R03